Remuneration is the pay or other financial compensation provided in exchange for an employee's services performed (not to be confused with giving (away), or donating, or the act of providing to). A number of complementary benefits in addition to pay are increasingly popular remuneration mechanisms. Remuneration is one component of reward management. In the UK it can also refer to the automatic division of profits attributable to members in a Limited Liability Partnership (LLP).

Types
Remuneration can include:
Commission
Employee benefits
Employee stock ownership
Executive compensation
Deferred compensation
Salary
Performance-linked incentives
Wage
Mandatory compensation payable by an employer to an employee for the benefit obtained from a patent for an invention made by an employee

United States
For wage withholding purposes under U.S. income tax law, the term "wage" means remuneration (with certain exceptions) for services performed by an employee for an employer.

Under the faithless servant doctrine, a doctrine under the laws of a number of states in the United States, and most notably New York State law, an employee who acts unfaithfully towards his or her employer must forfeit all remuneration  received during the period of disloyalty.

References

External links